The 1924 United States presidential election in New Hampshire took place on November 4, 1924, as part of the 1924 United States presidential election which was held throughout all contemporary 48 states. Voters chose four representatives, or electors to the Electoral College, who voted for president and vice president. 

New Hampshire voted for the Republican nominee, incumbent President Calvin Coolidge of Massachusetts, over the Democratic nominee, Ambassador John W. Davis of West Virginia. Coolidge ran with former Budget Director Charles G. Dawes of Illinois, while Davis ran with Governor Charles W. Bryan of Nebraska. Also in the running that year was the Progressive Party nominee, Senator Robert M. La Follette of Wisconsin and his running mate Senator Burton K. Wheeler of Montana. La Follette’s support base was primarily among rural German and Scandinavian Americans, and he possessed little appeal in the Northeast outside a few New York and Boston anti-Prohibition precincts. Excluding the former Confederacy where the lower classes were almost entirely disfranchised, New Hampshire would prove La Follette’s third-weakest state – and overall the Granite State was La Follette’s tenth-weakest of 48.

Coolidge won New Hampshire by a margin of 25.11% of the vote, although this was marginally lower than his national margin of 25.22% over Davis.

The 1920s were a fiercely Republican decade in American politics, and New Hampshire in that era was a fiercely Republican state in presidential elections. The economic boom and social good feelings of the Roaring Twenties under popular Republican leadership virtually guaranteed Calvin Coolidge an easy win in the state against the conservative Southern Democrat John Davis, who had little appeal in Northern states like New Hampshire apart from being the only pro-League of Nations candidate. New Hampshire would still prove Davis’ third-strongest antebellum free state behind Indiana and Rhode Island. Due to La Follette’s lack of appeal vis-à-vis his Midwest and Western support base, both Coolidge and Davis exceeded their national vote share by around five percent in the Granite State.

Coolidge also enjoyed a unique personal popularity which helped him in the state and the rest of New England. He was the epitome of a traditional New England Yankee, having been born in the small-town of Plymouth Notch in neighboring Vermont, and establishing his political career in neighboring Massachusetts as the state's governor. Thus Coolidge remained especially popular with voters across the New England region.

Results

Results by county

See also
 United States presidential elections in New Hampshire

References

New Hampshire
1924
1924 New Hampshire elections